Heriberto De Jesús Jurado Flores (born 3 January 2005) is a Mexican professional footballer who plays as a winger for Liga MX club Necaxa. He was included in The Guardian's "Next Generation 2022".

Club career
A native of Cacahoatán, Jurado began playing football in Necaxa's youth system. He made his Liga MX debut for the club in October 2021.

International career
On 19 June 2022, Jurado made his debut with the under-20 team against Suriname. He was also named to the squad for the CONCACAF Under-20 Championship in June 2022.

Career statistics

Club

Honours
Individual
Liga MX All-Star: 2022

References

2005 births
Living people
Footballers from Mexico City
Mexican footballers
Mexico youth international footballers
Association football midfielders
Liga MX players
Club Necaxa footballers
Mexico under-20 international footballers